Lounsbury Foods, also known as Cedarvale Food Products, is a privately held food processing company established in 1962 with headquarters in Toronto, Ontario. It is Canada's largest processor of horseradish. Other products include seafood sauce, tartar sauce, mustard, and mint sauce.

The company's factory, located on Wiltshire Avenue, produces approximately 7.2 million bottles of product each year, selling across Canada and exported into the United States.

Lounsbury Foods Limited is a North American food processing facility of horseradish and seafood cocktail sauce products. In 2020, Lounsbury Foods was acquired by Giraffe Foods, an Ontario-based leading private label sauce manufacturer for North America. Previously known as Cedervale Food Products, Lounsbury Foods is Canada’s largest processor of horseradish. It was first established by the Lounsbury family in 1962, on Wiltshire Avenue in Toronto, Ontario.

Giraffe Foods has incorporated Lounsbury into its existing services, as an extension into horseradish and ginger applications.

References

Manufacturing companies based in Toronto
Food and drink companies of Canada
Retail companies established in 1962
Condiment companies